James Borradaile (born 6 February 1798) was an English first-class cricketer associated with Marylebone Cricket Club (MCC) who was active in the 1820s. He is recorded in two matches, totalling 20 runs with a highest score of 16 and holding two catches.

References

English cricketers
English cricketers of 1787 to 1825
Marylebone Cricket Club cricketers
1798 births
Year of death unknown
Marylebone Cricket Club First 8 with 3 Others cricketers